Off is the latest album of Kurdish artist Ciwan Haco. It has been released in April 2006 in Europe. It features 13 songs, including the electro-pop Li hêviya te and several ballads. All songs are mainly sung in the Kurdish language, although a small part of the song "Li hêviya te" features brief French language vocals (though sung by a woman, and not by Ciwan Haco himself).

Track listing
 "Ez dimam"
 "Dil ketîme"
 "Felek"
 "Daristana te"
 "Dipirsin"
 "Kal"
 "Xunav"
 "Welatê min"
 "Havîn"
 "Li hêviya te"
 "Winda bû"
 "Hayê"
 "Gotin sar dibin"

2006 albums